The Pinto Mountains are found in southern California, USA, at the north-central part of Joshua Tree National Park. The range is made up of dark gneiss, and the creosote bush is the dominant plant in the area.

Wilderness
Established in 2009 by the U.S. Congress, the Pinto Mountains Wilderness protects the rugged mountain range to the north of Joshua Tree National Park.  The 24,348 acre desert wilderness area is managed by the U.S. Bureau of Land Management as part of the National Wilderness Preservation System.

References

External links
Pinto Mountains Wilderness - BLM

Mountain ranges of Southern California
Mountain ranges of Riverside County, California
Joshua Tree National Park
Wilderness areas of California